Niklas Olausson (born May 12, 1986) is a Swedish professional ice hockey forward. He is currently playing with Luleå HF in the Swedish Hockey League (SHL).

Olausson played three seasons abroad in the Swiss National League and Finnish Liiga, before returning to the SHL for a second stint with Luleå HF on 24 March 2017.

References

External links

1986 births
Living people
EHC Basel players
EHC Biel players
Graz 99ers players
Linköping HC players
Luleå HF players
Oulun Kärpät players
Swedish ice hockey centres
Tingsryds AIF players
EHC Visp players